Code is the third novel in the Virals series of novels for young adults written by the American forensic anthropologist and crime writer, Kathy Reichs and her son Brendan Reichs, featuring Tory Brennan, great-niece of Temperance Brennan.

Plot
The Virals are put to the ultimate test when they find a geocache containing an ornate puzzle box. Shelton decodes the cipher inside, only to find more tantalizing clues left by "The Gamemaster." A second, greater geocache is within reach—if the Virals are up to the challenge.

But the hunt takes a dark turn when Tory locates the other box—a fake bomb, along with a sinister proposal from The Gamemaster. Now, the real game has begun: another bomb is out there—a real one—and the clock is ticking.

But, unknowingly, one of the Virals has betrayed them. But will the others forgive them?

Characters

Additional to the recurring characters of the series, the following characters appear.

 Temperance Brennan – Tory's great aunt, a forensic anthropologist;
 The Gamemaster-the creator of the game found in the geocache;

References

Reviews

External links
Virals series official website

Novels by Kathy Reichs
American young adult novels
2013 American novels
Novels set in South Carolina
Razorbill books